Tūranga is the main public library in Christchurch, New Zealand. It opened on 12 October 2018 and replaced the nearby Christchurch Central Library that was closed on the day of the 2011 Christchurch earthquake.

Location and prior buildings
Tūranga is located in the north-eastern quadrant of Cathedral Square and fronts Gloucester and Colombo Streets. The original wooden building on the site was demolished in 1885; the then-owner Fred Hobbs replaced it with a substantial building of permanent materials that became known as Cathedral Chambers. The location had earlier become known as Hobbs' Corner after its prominent owner who had painted his name on the wooden building. Cathedral Chambers was replaced with the Colonial Mutual Limited (or CML) building in 1975, so named after its main tenant. This office building was later converted to a hotel and was last known as the Camelot Hotel.

History
The previous library closed with the 2011 Christchurch earthquake as the Christchurch Central City was cordoned off. The 2012 Christchurch Central Recovery Plan, commonly referred to as the Blueprint, identified 17 anchor projects, including a new central library. Through the Blueprint, the responsibility for delivering the building was assigned to Christchurch City Council. Partners for the delivery were Ngāi Tahu and the Canterbury Earthquake Recovery Authority (CERA). The indicative project delivery schedule in the Blueprint, developed on behalf of CERA, showed a proposed opening of the new library during the third quarter of 2015. In a publication titled Anchor Projects Overview updated in June 2014, the opening date was shown as January 2017. In a pamphlet published by CERA in November 2014, the anticipated opening date was shown for the third quarter of 2017.

On 26 March 2015, plans for a new $85 million dollar library were unveiled to city councillors. The new library, named Tūranga (from the Māori language), is one-third larger than the previous library, the largest library in the South Island and the third-largest in New Zealand, behind Auckland and Wellington's central libraries.  The replacement library was designed by both Architectus, a New Zealand architecture firm, and Schmidt Hammer Lassen, an award-winning Danish architecture firm. The building's design is inspired by the golden hues reflected upon the Port Hills, which are an important part in Christchurch's cityscape.

Soon after construction started on the new library, the Christchurch City Council increased their contribution to the library from $60 million to $95 million. This controversial cost increase was due to multiple factors, such as acquiring land and inflation.

The library was opened to the public on 12 October 2018, with over 13,000 people visiting on its opening weekend.

The library has won a number of awards.

Naming
The library's name was offered by Te Ngāi Tūāhuriri rūnanga. It makes reference to Whitireia, the Māori name for Cathedral Square. Paikea was an ancestor of Ngāi Tahu and Whitireia was the name of his house located in Tūranga, the original name for Gisborne in the North Island. The name thus values the location where Paikea's house was located. Christchurch city councillors approved the name in September 2017. There was an initial intention to give the library an English descriptor of "A Place of Discovery" but this idea was dropped and there is no English word for Christchurch's central library.

Facilities 
Facilities include:

 $1.2 million 7m-long touch-sensitive Discovery Wall offering an interactive digital picture of Christchurch
 Café
 200-seat community arena
 Activity rooms
 Crafts facilities
 3D printing facilities
 Exhibition space
 Study spaces
 Meeting rooms
 Children’s play area with LED lightshow.

Computing and technology facilities include:

Public computers with free internet access
Free Wi-Fi
PlayStations
Virtual reality (VR) headsets and gaming
Printing and photocopying
Scan to email or USB
Production and audio visual studios.

Notes

References

External links
 

Libraries in Christchurch
Buildings and structures completed in 2018
Buildings and structures in Christchurch
Christchurch Central City
Tourist attractions in Christchurch